Youness Mokhtar (born 29 August 1991) is a professional footballer who plays as a winger for FC Eindhoven. Born in the Netherlands, Mokhtar has represented both his native country and Morocco internationally at youth level.

Club career

Early career 
Mokhtar formerly played for FC Eindhoven, FC Twente, Al-Nassr and PEC Zwolle.

In April 2019, he signed a contract with Stabæk. The club announced on 3 June 2019 that Mokhtar had left the club by mutual agreement.

Columbus Crew SC
On 19 July 2019, Mokhtar signed with Columbus Crew SC of Major League Soccer as a free transfer. He made his debut on 10 August 2019 in a 2–2 draw against FC Cincinnati in the first Hell Is Real Derby in MLS, coming on as a substitute for Luis Díaz. He scored his first goal for the team about a month and a half later on 29 September 2019 in a 2–0 win over the Philadelphia Union. Mokhtar would make eight total appearances in the 2019 season.

Mokhtar remained with the team for the 2020 season. He scored important goals during the MLS is Back Tournament, scoring in the 4–0 win over FC Cincinnati and scoring the lone goal in a 1–0 win over Atlanta United, helping the team win their group. He was frequently used as both a starter and a substitute during the season, scoring three goals in 19 appearances, ten of which were starts. Columbus declined their contract option on Mokhtar following their 2020 season.

On 25 January 2021, Mokhtar joined Dutch Eredivisie side ADO Den Haag for the remainder of their season.

In March 2023, Mokhtar returned to the Netherlands to join FC Eindhoven on a deal until the end of the season.

International career
Mokhtar was born in the Netherlands to parents of Moroccan descent. He was first called up to the Netherlands U17 squad, followed by a couple appearances with the Netherlands U19. Mokhtar then switched federations and joined the Morocco U20 team. Mokhtar was last called up by the Morocco U23s.

Honours
Columbus Crew
 MLS Cup: 2020

References

External links

 
 
 
 

Living people
1991 births
Dutch sportspeople of Moroccan descent
Dutch footballers
Moroccan footballers
Footballers from Utrecht (city)
Association football wingers
PSV Eindhoven players
FC Eindhoven players
PEC Zwolle players
FC Twente players
Al Nassr FC players
MKE Ankaragücü footballers
Stabæk Fotball players
Columbus Crew players
ADO Den Haag players
Eerste Divisie players
Eredivisie players
Saudi Professional League players
Süper Lig players
Eliteserien players
Raja CA players
Netherlands youth international footballers
Morocco youth international footballers
Morocco under-20 international footballers
2011 CAF U-23 Championship players
Moroccan expatriate footballers
Dutch expatriate footballers
Moroccan expatriate sportspeople in Saudi Arabia
Expatriate footballers in Saudi Arabia
Moroccan expatriate sportspeople in Turkey
Expatriate footballers in Turkey
Moroccan expatriate sportspeople in Norway
Expatriate footballers in Norway
Moroccan expatriate sportspeople in the United States
Expatriate soccer players in the United States
Dutch expatriate sportspeople in Saudi Arabia
Dutch expatriate sportspeople in Turkey
Dutch expatriate sportspeople in Norway
Dutch expatriate sportspeople in the United States
Expatriate footballers in Indonesia
Moroccan expatriate sportspeople in Indonesia
Dutch expatriate sportspeople in Indonesia
Major League Soccer players
Jong FC Twente players
Liga 1 (Indonesia) players
Bhayangkara F.C. players